The men's Keirin at the 2012 Olympic Games in London took place at the London Velopark on 7 August.

Chris Hoy from Great Britain won the gold medal.

Competition format

The Keirin races involve 6.5 laps of the track behind a pace-setter, followed by a 2.5 lap sprint to the finish.  The tournament consisted of preliminary heats and repechages, a semi-finals round, and the finals. The heats and repechages narrowed the field to 12. The semi-finals divided the remaining 12 into six finalists. The final round also included a ranking race for 7th to 12th place.

Schedule 
All times are British Summer Time

Results

First round

Heat 1

Heat 2

Heat 3

Repechages

Heat 1

Heat 2

Second round

Heat 1

Heat 2

Finals

1st to 6th

7th to 12th

References

Track cycling at the 2012 Summer Olympics
Cycling at the Summer Olympics – Men's keirin
Men's events at the 2012 Summer Olympics